The 1956 Texas Tech Red Raiders football team represented Texas Technological College—now known as Texas Tech University—as an independent during the 1956 NCAA University Division football season. In their sixth season under head coach DeWitt Weaver, the Red Raiders compiled a 2–7–1 record and were outscored by opponents by a combined total of 216 to 117. The team's statistical leaders included Buddy Hill with 326 passing yards, Doug Duncan with 360 rushing yards, and Ken Vakey with 180 receiving yards. The team played its home games at Clifford B. and Audrey Jones Stadium.

Schedule

References

Texas Tech
Texas Tech Red Raiders football seasons
Texas Tech Red Raiders football